Yessan-Mayo (also known as Yesan, Mayo, and natively known as Yamano) is a Papuan language spoken by 2000 people in Papua New Guinea. It is spoken in Maio and Yessan villages of Yessan ward, Ambunti Rural LLG, East Sepik Province.

Phonology
The phonology of Yessan-Mayo is described in Foley (2018) as such:

Vowels

Consonants

Pronouns
Foreman (1974) describes two kinds of pronouns in Yessan-Mayo: non-emphatic and emphatic pronouns.

In addition to the non-emphatic pronouns, there is also the reflexive pronoun kwarara (self), as well as the demonstrative pronouns op (this) and otop (that).

Non-emphatic

Emphatic

External links 
 Paradisec has a collection of Don Laycock's (DL2) that includes Yessan-Mayo language materials.

References

Tama languages
Languages of East Sepik Province
Languages of Sandaun Province